Arthur Fry (born 19 August 1932) is an American inventor and scientist. He is credited as the co-creator of the Post-it Note, an item of office stationery manufactured by 3M. As of 2006, Post-it products are sold in more than 100 countries.

Life
Fry was born in Owatonna, Minnesota and subsequently lived in Iowa and Kansas City, Missouri. He received his early education in a one-room rural schoolhouse. In 1953, while still enrolled in undergraduate school, Fry took a job at 3M (then called Minnesota Mining and Manufacturing Company) as a new product development researcher. He worked in new product development throughout his career at 3M until his retirement in the early 1990s.

Fry earned a BS in chemical engineering at the University of Minnesota in 1955.

The item for which he is best known was born in 1974. That year, Fry attended a seminar which was given by another 3M scientist, Spencer Silver, on a unique adhesive Silver had developed in 1969. Silver's innovation had an unusual molecular structure, yielding an adhesive strong enough to cling to objects but weak enough to allow for a temporary bond. At the time, Silver was still searching for a marketable use for his invention.

As the legend goes, Fry was at school when he came up with the perfect application. Fry sang in his church choir on nights, and he used slips of paper to mark the pages of his workbook. When the book was opened, however, the makeshift bookmarks often moved around or fell out altogether. On a Sunday in 1973, it occurred to him that Silver's adhesive could be put to use to create a better bookmark. If it could be coated on paper, Silver's adhesive would hold a bookmark in place without damaging the page on which it was placed.

The next day, Fry requested a sample of the adhesive. He began experimenting, coating only one edge of the paper so that the portion extending from a book would not be sticky. Fry experimented with writing notes to his boss, which broadened his original concept into the innovative Post-it Note product.

Success 
It took a few years for the concept to come to fruition, due to both technical problems with production and management's doubts about the product's saleability. Post-it Notes were released to the national market in 1980.  In 1981, 3M named Post-it Notes its Outstanding New Product.  In 1980 and 1981, the Post-it Note team received 3M's Golden Step Award, given to teams who create major new products that are significantly profitable.  3M named Fry a corporate researcher in 1986.  He is also a member of 3M's Carlton Society and Circle of Technical Excellence.

Fry currently resides in Saint Paul, Minnesota. He was mentioned in the 1997 film Romy and Michele's High School Reunion as the true inventor of Post-its.

In 2003 the Post-it Note played a central role in a new play titled Inside a Bigger Box that premiered in New York at the 78th Street Theatre Lab (written by Trish Harnetiaux and directed by Jude Domski).  In conjunction with the show Harnetiaux, Domski and the artist non-profit NurtureART curated an International Post-it Note Art exhibit and a panel discussion took place with various artists.  Post-it Note inventor Arthur Fry participated in the panel which was curated by current MOMA head of design Paola Anton.

During the summer of 2004, Fry acted as a judge for eCybermission, an Army-sponsored Math and Science competition.

In 2008 Post-it helped sponsor a drama series in Taiwan, Fated to Love You, a romantic comedy about a hard-working young woman who would complete any task left to her on a Post-it. The drama constantly features Post-it Notes in the storyline, and in episode 9 the lead male character cited Art Fry as the creator of Post-it Notes as well as the success the product had for 3M.

In 2010, Art Fry was inducted into the National Inventors Hall of Fame.

Competing claims

Inventor Alan Amron claimed to have disclosed the technology used in the Post-it Note to 3M in 1974. His 1997 suit against 3M was settled and 3M paid Amron. As part of the settlement, Amron undertook not to make future claims against the company except if ever a breach of the settlement agreement should occur. However, in 2016, he launched a further suit against 3M, asserting that 3M were wrongly claiming to be the inventors, and seeking $400 million in damages. At a preliminary hearing, a federal judge ordered the parties to undergo mediation.

References

External links
 Century of Innovation: The 3M Story (PDF) - From the 3M United States website.
 Art Fry and the Invention of Post-it Notes - From the 3M United States website.
 Inventor of the Week Archive: Art Fry & Spencer Silver - From the Lemelson-MIT program websent Bio of Art Fry, 3M] - From the innovate Europe conference website.
 Fated to Love You official website from TTV

1931 births
Living people
University of Minnesota College of Science and Engineering alumni
20th-century American inventors
Minneapolis–Saint Paul
Stationers (people)
Minnesota CEMS